Abraham is known as the patriarch of the Israelite people through Isaac, the son born to him and Sarah in their old age and the patriarch of Arabs through his son Ishmael, born to Abraham and Hagar, Sarah's Egyptian servant.

Although Abraham's forefathers were from southern Mesopotamia (in present-day Iraq) according to the biblical narrative, Yahweh led Abraham on a journey to the land of Canaan, which he promised to his children.

Source criticism
The genealogy of Abraham appears in Genesis 5, Genesis 10:1-7, 20, 22-23, 31-32, and Genesis 11. The documentary hypothesis attributes these genealogies to the Priestly source.

Biblical narrative
Abram and Sarai prospered materially but had no children. Abram thought to leave his estate to a trusted servant, but God promised him a son and heir. When he was 86 years old, Sarai suggested and Abram agreed that a practical way to have a child was through Sarai’s servant Hagar. Hagar conceived right away and in time Ishmael was born. This situation brought strife rather than happiness between Hagar and Sarai. Nevertheless, God saw Hagar’s suffering and promised that although this was not the child promised to Abram, he would nevertheless make Ishmael’s descendants into a great nation also.

In chapter 17 of Genesis, "Almighty God" changed Abram’s name to Abraham, for he would be a father of many nations. In addition, his wife Sarai's name was changed to Sarah, for she would be a mother of nations. Three visitors came to Abraham and said that he would have a son. Sarah believed she was too old to have a child and laughed. Yet she did conceive (Genesis 21:1-7) and had a baby named Isaac. After the death of his mother, Sarah, Isaac married Rebekah. Abraham then married Keturah, who bore him six more sons – Zimran, Jokshan, Medan, Midian, Ishbak and Shuah.

Family tree
The following is a family tree for the descendants of the line of Noah's son Shem, through Abraham to Jacob and his sons. Dashed lines are marriage connections.

Quranic narrative 
 
The family members and descendants of Abraham are called aal-Ibrahim, figuratively "The (people of) Abraham".

As per:
فَقَدْ آتَيْنَا آلَ إِبْرَاهِيمَ الْكِتَابَ وَالْحِكْمَةَ وَآتَيْنَاهُم مُّلْكًا عَظِيمًا...
"… but surely, We had given the 'Family of Abraham'—the Writings and the Wisdom—and conferred to them a Kingdom of magnificence." ⁠—Sūrat an-Nisā'  4, āyāt 54; al-Qur'ān. 

Other sources, particularly the widely accepted Hadith, also gives references to the Family of Abraham:
Tafsir Al-Tabari: aal-Ibrahim are the believers, based on a narrative related to Ibn Abbas of the verse: "Indeed, Allah chose Adam and Noah and the family of Abraham and the family of 'Imran over the worlds" V.33, S.3. He explained: They are the believers of the family of Abraham, the family of Imran, the family of Yaseen, and the family of Muhammad, then quoted the verse: "Indeed, the most worthy of Abraham among the people are those who followed him [in submission to Allah] and this prophet, and those who believe [in his message]. And Allah is the ally of the believers." V.68, S.3. They are the believers. 
Tafsir As-Sa'di: Aal Ibrahim are the prophets who succeeded him because they are among his descendants, and the Prophet Muhammad belongs to them.
Tafsir Al-Baghawi: Aal Ibrahim referred to Abraham himself, and has been also said that Aal Ibrahim are Ismael (Ishmael), Ishaq (Isaac), Ya'qub (Jacob), and Al-Asbat (the 12 sons of Jacob) adding that Muhammad is one of Aal Ibrahim.

Based on these interpretations, Aal Ibrahim are:
His wife, Sarah, since the Angels addressed her using the term (Ahl Al-Bayt) meaning, the people of the house in the verse: They said, "Are you amazed at the decree of Allah? May the mercy of Allah and His blessings be upon you, people of the house." Indeed, He is Praiseworthy and Honorable.""V.73, S.11
His son Ismael (Ishmael)
His son Ishaq (Isaac)
His grandson Ya'qub (Jacob)
His nephew Lut (Lot)
Al-Asbat (the 12 sons of Jacob)
Musa (Moses)
Harun (Aaron)
Dawud (David)
Sulaiman (Solomon)
Ayub (Job)
Al-Yas' (Elisha)
Yunus (Jonah)
Zakariya (Zachariya)
Yahya (John)
Imran (Amram)
Maryam (Mary)
Isa (Jesus)
Iliyas (Elias)
Muhammad

These are Aal Ibrahim added to them all the believers among the descendants of Abraham. "And that was Our [conclusive] argument which We gave Abraham against his people. We raise by degrees whom We will. Indeed, your Lord is Wise and Knowing. And We gave to Abraham, Isaac and Jacob - all [of them] We guided. And Noah, We guided before; and among his descendants, David and Solomon and Job and Joseph and Moses and Aaron. Thus do We reward the doers of good. And Zechariah and John and Jesus and Elias - and all were of the righteous. And Ishmael and Elisha and Jonah and Lot - and all [of them] We preferred over the worlds. And [some] among their fathers and their descendants and their brothers - and We chose them and We guided them to a straight path." Vs.83-87 S.6

References

Abraham
Bible genealogy
Family trees